Maki Takada (髙田真希, Takada Maki, born 23 August 1989) is a Japanese basketball player. She represented Japan in the basketball competition at the 2016 Summer Olympics. and at the 2020 Summer Olympics, winning a silver medal.

References

External links

1989 births
Living people
Japanese women's basketball players
Basketball players at the 2016 Summer Olympics
Basketball players at the 2020 Summer Olympics
Olympic basketball players of Japan
Basketball players at the 2010 Asian Games
Asian Games medalists in basketball
Asian Games bronze medalists for Japan
Power forwards (basketball)
Medalists at the 2010 Asian Games
People from Toyohashi
Olympic medalists in basketball
Olympic silver medalists for Japan
Medalists at the 2020 Summer Olympics
21st-century Japanese women